Millie Brown may refer to:

Millie Brown (footballer) (born 2001), Australian rules footballer
 Millie Brown (performance artist) (born 1986), English performance artist
Millie Bobby Brown (born 2004), British actress
Police Constable Millie Brown, a character from British television series The Bill

See also 
 Millicent Browne (1881–1975), British suffragette